Giovanni Battista Giorgi, O.S.B. (1536 – 24 November 1608) was a Roman Catholic prelate who served as Bishop of Ston (1606–1608).

Biography
Giovanni Battista Giorgi was born in Raguse and ordained a priest in the Order of Saint Benedict. On 14 August 1606, he was appointed by Pope Paul V as Bishop of Ston. He served as Bishop of Ston until his death on 24 November 1608.

References 

1608 deaths
17th-century Roman Catholic bishops in Croatia
Bishops appointed by Pope Paul V
Benedictine bishops
1536 births